Old Probst Church, also known as Propst Lutheran Church, is a historic Lutheran church located near Brandywine, Pendleton County, West Virginia. It was built about 1887, and is a rectangular frame building with clapboard siding on a cut stone foundation.  The church was in use until 1920, then renovated starting in 1968 for use as a community center.  The surrounding property includes the site of the first church, built about 1769.  A second log church building was removed from the site in 1885, and used as a house, and later a barn.

It was listed on the National Register of Historic Places in 1986.

References

Churches on the National Register of Historic Places in West Virginia
Lutheran churches in West Virginia
Churches completed in 1887
19th-century Lutheran churches in the United States
Buildings and structures in Pendleton County, West Virginia
National Register of Historic Places in Pendleton County, West Virginia
Cemeteries on the National Register of Historic Places in West Virginia
Lutheran cemeteries in the United States